Dennis Raymond Oakes (born 10 April 1946) is an English former cricketer and footballer. In cricket, Oakes was a right-handed batsman who bowled leg break. He was born at Bedworth, Warwickshire.

Oakes made his first-class debut for Warwickshire against Northamptonshire in the 1965 County Championship. He made four further first-class appearances in that season, the last of which came against Essex. In his five first-class matches, he scored a total of 81 runs at an average of 11.57, with a high score of 33.

He also played football for Coventry City, Notts County, Peterborough United and Chelmsford City, making 205 appearances in the Football League as a central defender.

References

External links
Dennis Oakes at ESPNcricinfo
Dennis Oakes at CricketArchive

1946 births
Living people
People from Bedworth
English cricketers
Warwickshire cricketers
English footballers
Coventry City F.C. players
Notts County F.C. players
Peterborough United F.C. players
Chelmsford City F.C. players
Association football defenders
English Football League players